Agu Amede is a village in Eha Amufu community, Isi-uzo local government area of Enugu State.

References

Populated places in Enugu State